Stanley Kerin Amour (2 April 1900 – 29 November 1979) was an Australian politician. Born in Hamilton, New South Wales, he was educated at Catholic schools before becoming an insurance agent. He served in the military from 1915–1917. In 1937, he was elected to the Australian Senate as a Labor Senator for New South Wales. He was selected largely because his surname began with A, as did the other three candidates, Bill Ashley, John Armstrong and Tom Arthur. After leaving the ALP briefly for the Langite Australian Labor Party (Non-Communist), Amour served in the Senate for over 20 years, retiring in 1965. He died in 1979.

External links

References

Australian Labor Party members of the Parliament of Australia
Lang Labor members of the Parliament of Australia
Members of the Australian Senate for New South Wales
Members of the Australian Senate
1900 births
1979 deaths
20th-century Australian politicians